The 2004 World Karate Championships are the 17th edition of the World Karate Championships, and were held in Monterrey, Mexico from November 18 to November 21, 2004.

Medalists

Men

Women

Medal table

Participating nations 
582 athletes from 79 nations competed.

 (1)
 (7)
 (13)
 (19)
 (1)
 (6)
 (8)
 (15)
 (8)
 (13)
 (4)
 (13)
 (6)
 (6)
 (5)
 (8)
 (3)
 (17)
 (2)
 (3)
 (4)
 (4)
 (7)
 (9)
 (9)
 (13)
 (3)
 (3)
 (4)
 (22)
 (15)
 (7)
 (7)
 (8)
 (3)
 (2)
 (6)
 (12)
 (4)
 (15)
 (20)
 (1)
 (2)
 (3)
 (4)
 (5)
 (7)
 (21)
 (1)
 (1)
 (10)
 (2)
 (2)
 (8)
 (5)
 (5)
 (8)
 (3)
 (2)
 (3)
 (12)
 (1)
 (8)
 (14)
 (14)
 (7)
 (2)
 (15)
 (18)
 (21)
 (1)
 (6)
 (8)
 (15)
 (11)
 (3)
 (11)
 (5)
 (2)

References

External links
 World Karate Federation
 Karate Records – World Championship 2004
 Men's resultsWomen's results
 Official website

World Championships
World Karate Championships
World Karate Championships
Karate Championships
Karate competitions in Mexico
World Karate Championships